The 5th Japan Record Award was held on December 27, 1963. Michiyo Azusa was the first female solo singer to win the JRA.

Emcee
Takayuki Akutagawa
4th time as the emcee of JRA.

Award winners
Japan Record Award
 Michiyo Azusa for "Konnichiwa Aka Chan" 
 Lyricist: Rokusuke Ei
 Composer: Hachidai Nakamura
 Arranger: Hachidai Nakamura
 Record Company: King Records

Vocalist Award
Frank Nagai for "Aka Chan Wa Osamada"
Awarded again after 4 years, 2nd vocalist award.

New Artist Award
Kazuo Funaki for "Koukou San Nen Sei" and "Gakuen Hiroba"
Akemi Misawa for "Shima No Blues" and "Watashi Wa Nagare No Watari Tori"

Composer Award
Taku Izumi for "Miagete Goran Yoru No Hoshi O"
Singer: Kyu Sakamoto

Arranger Award
Hiroshi Miyagawa for "Koi No Vacance"
Singer: The Peanuts

Lyricist Award
Toshio Oka for "Koukou San Nen Sei"
Singer: Kazuo Funaki

Planning Award
Nippon Columbia for "Nihon No Minyo"
Awarded after 2 years, 3rd planning award.

Children's Song Award
Yoshiko Mari for "Omocha No Chachacha"

Nominations

JRA

Children's song award

References

Japan Record Awards
1963
Japan Record Awards
Japan Record Awards